"This Is for the Lover in You" is a song written by Howard Hewett, member of the trio Shalamar, and songwriter Dana Meyers.  The track was originally recorded by Shalamar and appeared on their 1980 Platinum album, Three for Love.

The song was the third single released from their album, Three for Love. The single peaked at No. 17 on the U.S. R&B chart in 1981.

In 2009, Essence magazine included the song in their list of the "25 Best Slow Jams of All Time".

Charts

Babyface version

"This Is for the Lover in You" was later remade by American singer, songwriter, and record producer Babyface for his fourth studio album, The Day (1996). It features LL Cool J and the former members of Shalamar: Howard Hewett, Jody Watley, and Jeffrey Daniel. The Babyface version was a successful hit, reaching #6 on the US Hot 100 chart, #2 on the US R&B chart, and #12 on the UK Singles Chart. The song was considered to be atypical for Babyface when it was released. The song's main melody bears resemblance to Teddy Pendergrass' hit "Close the Door".

Critical reception
Larry Flick from Billboard described Babyface's version as "a smoldering, jeep-fashioned revision" of a Shalamar chestnut that reunites the original members of that act on background vocals. He added, "It's a nice touch, though nothing diverts the ear from Babyface's suave and soulful vocals for longer than a second or two. Added juice is provided by LL Cool J, who freestyles in the background with macho flair—a vibrant contrast to Babyface's performance. No need to speculate on this single's success. Just get used to hearing it on the radio nonstop for the next couple of months."

Charts and certifications

Weekly charts

Year-end charts

Certifications

Other versions
In 1994, saxophonist Gerald Albright released a rendition from the album Smooth.

References

1980 songs
1981 singles
1996 singles
Shalamar songs
Babyface (musician) songs
LL Cool J songs
Song recordings produced by Babyface (musician)
Song recordings produced by Trackmasters
Epic Records singles
SOLAR Records singles
Hip hop soul songs